Shree Krishna Bhakto Meera is a 2021 Indian Bengali mythological drama television series which premiered on 26 July 2021 on Star Jalsha. It is also available on the digital platform Disney+ Hotstar before its telecast. It is produced by Nispal Singh and Surinder Singh under the banner of Surinder Films and stars Joey Debroy, Debadrita Basu, Arshiya Mukherjee, Ankit Mazumder and Prarabdhi Singha in lead roles.

Airing history
The show launched on 26 July 2021 and was given the timeslot of 9pm, but was shifted to 11pm due to degrading target rating point. The show ended 4 months later, on 5 December.

Plot
The story is a mythology based story about princess Meera, her marriage to Raja Bhojraj and devotion for Lord Krishna. Apart from the story of Meera's love and devotion for Lord Krishna, it also shows how her marriage life worked with Raja Bhojraj and how he protected her till her death.

Cast

Main
Debadrita Basu as Princess Meera Bai : Veer Kumari and Ratan Singh's daughter, an ardent devotee of Lord Krishna and Rajkumar Bhoj's love interest turned wife (later widow). 
Arshiya Mukherjee as Young Meera
Joey Debroy  as Bhoj Raj : Maharana Sangram Singh's eldest son, Rani Dhona Bai's biological son, Rajkumari Meera's husband. (Deceased) 
Ankit Mazumder as Young Bhojraj. 
Prarabdhi Singha as Lord Krishna

Recurring
Meera's family
Atri Bhattacharya as Prince Jaimal :  Meera's elder cousin brother.
Tamagno Manna as Young Jaimal
Poonam Basak as Mrinal Kumari : Meera's elder cousin sister-in-law, Jaimal's wife.
Rayati Bhattacharya as Veer Kumari / Chhoto Bourani : Ratan Singh's wife, Meera's mother. (Deceased)
Sutirtha Saha as Ratan Singh : Meera's father, Veer Kumari's husband.
 Somjita Bhattacharya as Kokila : Mejo Bourani's assistant.  
Kuyasha Biswas as Princess Madhuraa : Meera's elder cousin sister,  Mejo Bourani and Viram Singh's daughter.
Tanishka Tiwari as Young Madhuraa
 Riyanka Dasgupta as Gourja aka Mejo Bourani : Madhuraa and Jaimal's mother, and Viram Singh's wife.
 Subhajit Banerjee as Viram Singh : Mejo Bourani's husband, Meera's elder paternal uncle. 
Hridlekha Banerjee as Boro Bourani : Meera's eldest paternal aunt, Raimal Singh's wife.
Subhrajit Dutta as Raimal Singh : Meera's eldest paternal uncle, Boro Bourani's husband. 
Sumanta Mukherjee as Maharaja Rao Dudaji : Champak Bai's husband, Meera, Madhuraa and Jaimal's grandfather. 
Kheyali Ghosh Dastidar as Maharani Champak Bai : Rao Dudaji's wife, Meera, Madhuraa and Jaimal's grandmother. 
 Bhoj's family
Sudip Sarkar as Prince Vikram : Rani Karma Bai's eldest biological son. 
Sarbik Pal as Young Vikram 
Sujata Dawn as Rani Karma Bai : Maharana Sangram Singh's second wife.
Chaitali Chakraborty as Mukta: Rani Karma Bai's Assistant 
Avery Singha Roy as Rani Dhona Bai : Bhoj and Darpona's biological mother, Maharana Sangram Singh's first wife, Vikram, Udaa Bai and Uday's step-mother.
Arijit Chowdhury as Maharana Sangram Singh : Bhoj, Vikram, Udaa, Uday and Darpona's father. 
Ishani Sengupta as Princess Udaa Bai : Bhoj's younger half-sister and Vikram's younger biological sister. 
Debmalya Gupta as Prince Uday Pratap Singh : Maharana Sangram Singh and Rani Karma Bai's youngest biological son. 
Adwitiya Basu Roy as Princess Darpona : Maharana Sangram Singh's biological daughter.

Others
Debdut Ghosh as Ravidas.
Bhaswar Chatterjee as Raj Purohit Bhairabnath 
Pratyush Kumar Bandyopadhyay as Narayan
 Rupam Singha as Suraj Mahal : Vikram, Udaa and Uday's maternal uncle
 Pritha Roy as Malini : Meera's close friend.
 Rajiv Banerjee as Raj Purohit of Meera's family

Production

Release
The show released on 26 July 2021.

Reception
The TV soap has been placed on an average rating on Bengali television in its first week.

References

Bengali-language television programming in India
2021 Indian television series debuts
2021 Indian television series endings
Indian drama television series
Star Jalsha original programming